Neeru Yadav is an Indian social worker and Sarpanch from Jhunjhunu, Rajasthan. She is known for Hockey Wali Sarpanch.

She established a Farmer Producers Organisation with the help of SIIRD (The Society of Indian Institute of Rural Development) in association with NABARD. Neeru Yadav has taken over the role of the Chairman of the Board of Directors of this company. She also apprised the people about the beneficial schemes of the government.

References

Indian social workers
Living people
Year of birth missing (living people)